Hundri is a village in the Leh district of Ladakh, India. It is located in the Nubra tehsil, beside the Shayok River. There is no bridge in village Hundri. Terchey and Udmaru are neighbours of Hundri. Fruits such as apricot, mulberry, apple, strawberry are grown there.

In Hundri, there is a need for a bridge between Udmaru and Hundri which will connect Udmaru, Hundri and Shukur village. It will also benefit the pilgrimage to Sham Gonbo and it will become the centre of attraction for tourists. There is a need for protection bandh at Shayok River as it poses a threat to the field, trees, and people's property. The people also face a drinking water problem as they depend on the Shayok River for it.

Demographics
According to the 2011 census of India, Hundri has 53 households. The effective literacy rate (i.e. the literacy rate of population excluding children aged 6 and below) is 47.75%.

References

Villages in Nubra tehsil